Rodney John Charles Preece (August 15, 1939 – July 22, 2021) was a British-Canadian political philosopher and historian of animal rights and vegetarianism. He was professor emeritus in the Department of Political Science at Wilfrid Laurier University. Preece authored and edited 19 books on topics including animal rights and welfare, vegetarianism, German politics, socialization in Europe, and political theory.

Biography 
Rodney John Charles Preece was born on 15 August 1939, in Cheadle Hulme, England. He earned a BA in Philosophy and PhD in Political Science from the University of Leicester. Preece went on to teach at the University of Surrey and University of Leicester. He moved to Canada in 1969, to lecture for a year at the University of Waterloo; he later accepted a full-time position at the university. In 1973, he joined Wilfrid Laurier University. He was later Maurice Young Invited Research Scholar in the Centre for Applied Ethics at the University of British Columbia.

At the start of his career, Preece's work focused on European politics, especially German politics, before moving on to political philosophy and ideology, particularly conservatism. Starting in the 1990s and for the remainder of his career, he focused entirely on animal rights and welfare. 

Preece authored and edited 19 books. His book Animals and Nature: Cultural Myths, Cultural Realities, was short-listed for the Harold Adams Innis Prize, the Raymond Klibansky Prize for the best book in the humanities and named a Choice Distinguished Academic Title.

Preece served on the board of directors of the Ontario Society for the Prevention of Cruelty to Animals (SPCA) and served on the executive boards for the Oxford Centre for Animal Ethics and the University of Guelph's Centre for the Study of Animal Welfare. He was also vice-president of the Canadian Federation of Humane Societies. Preece was also on the board of the Christian Vegetarian Association (CVA).

For many years, Preece owned an antique store in Waterloo, Ontario. He was married to Lorna Chamberlain, who predeceased him; they had two children. 

In 2013 Preece moved back to Cheadle Hulme after reuniting with his past girlfriend Janet Penny. He died there at the age of 81, on July 22, 2021.

Selected publications 
 Animal Welfare and Human Values (with Lorna Chamberlain; Wilfrid Laurier University Press, 1993)
 Animals and Nature: Cultural Myths, Cultural Realities (1998)
 Awe for the Tiger, Love for the Lamb: A Chronicle of Sensibility to Animals (2002)
 William Hamilton Drummond's Rights of Animals and Man's Obligation to Treat Them with Humanity (edited with Chien-hui Li; The Edwin Mellen Press, 2005)
 Brute Souls, Happy Beasts and Evolution: The Historical Status of Animals (2005)
 Sins of the Flesh: A History of Ethical Vegetarian Thought (2008)
 Animal Sensibility and Inclusive Justice in the Age of Bernard Shaw (2012)

References

External links 
 Rod Preece on "Brute Souls, Happy Beasts, and Evolution" - Animal Voices
Rod Preece, Jodey Castricano, and David Fraser - Bringing the Collective Together

1939 births
2021 deaths
20th-century Canadian male writers
20th-century Canadian philosophers
20th-century English male writers
20th-century English philosophers
21st-century Canadian male writers
21st-century Canadian philosophers
21st-century English male writers
21st-century English philosophers
Academics of the University of Leicester
Academics of the University of Surrey
Alumni of the University of Leicester
British animal rights scholars
British animal welfare scholars
Canadian animal rights scholars
Canadian animal welfare scholars
Canadian political philosophers
Christian vegetarianism
English expatriates in Canada
English male non-fiction writers
English political philosophers
Historians of animal rights
Historians of vegetarianism
People from Cheadle Hulme
Academic staff of the University of British Columbia
Academic staff of the University of Waterloo
Academic staff of Wilfrid Laurier University